There are related mythological figures named Porus or Poros ( "resource" or "plenty") in Greek classical literature.

In Plato's Symposium, Porus was the personification of resourcefulness or expediency. He was seduced by Penia (poverty) while drunk on more than his fill of nectar at Aphrodite's birthday.  Penia gave birth to Eros (love) from their union. Porus was the son of Metis. According to the character Diotima, Eros is forever in need because of his mother, but forever pursuing because of his father.

This figure exists in Roman mythology as well and is known as Pomona, in which Porus is the personification of abundance. He is the maternal half-brother of Athena.

Notes

Greek gods
Personifications in Greek mythology
Roman gods